Kowalewka is a river of Poland. It flows into the Pasiecka Struga, which terminates in Lake Drużno. Drużno is drained by the Elbląg.

Rivers of Poland
Rivers of Warmian-Masurian Voivodeship